Gekkoninae is a diverse subfamily of the family Gekkonidae, geckos. It has the most species and genera — over 850 species in 30 genera.  Hemidactylus and Cyrtodactylus together account for 185 species.

Genera

The following is a list of recognized genera:

 Agamura (2 species)
 Alsophylax (6 species)
 Altiphylax (5 species)
 Ancylodactylus (19 species)
 Bunopus (3 species)
 Carinatogecko (2 species)
 Cnemaspis (148 species)
 Crossobamon (1 or 2 species)
 Cryptactites (monotypic)
 Cyrtodactylus (297 species)
 Cyrtopodion (37 species)
 Dixonius (11 species)
 Dravidogecko (7 species)
 Gehyra (68 species)
 Gekko (86 species)
 Gonydactylus (4 species)
 Hemidactylus (190 species)
 Hemiphyllodactylus (51 species)
 Heteronotia (3 species)
 Lepidodactylus (44 species)
 Luperosaurus (8 species)
 Mediodactylus (13 species)
 Nactus (35 species)
 Palmatogecko (2 species)
 Pseudogekko (10 species)
 Rhinogekko (2 species)
 Stenodactylus (10 species)
 Teratolepis (2 species)
 Trachydactylus (2 species)
 Trigonodactylus (3 species)
 Tropiocolotes (15 species)

References

Geckos
Reptile subfamilies
Taxa named by John Edward Gray

fr:Gekkoninae